This is a list of rugby teams in Uzbekistan, as per the 2011/2012 season.

RC National University of Uzbekistan
RC Qanot
RC Tashkent Lions
RC Yangiyer

Rugby clubs
Uzbek
Rugby clubs